The 2003 Florida State Seminoles football team represented Florida State University during the 2003 NCAA Division I-A football season. The team was coached by Bobby Bowden and played their home games at Doak Campbell Stadium in Tallahassee, Florida. They were members of the Atlantic Coast Conference (ACC).

Schedule

References

Florida State
Florida State Seminoles football seasons
Atlantic Coast Conference football champion seasons
Florida State Seminoles football